Larry Dean Benson (1929–2015) was a professor of medieval literature at Harvard University. After an undergraduate degree at Arizona State University and a Ph.D. at the University of California, Berkeley, he taught at Harvard for 45 years, retiring in 1998. A scholar of Old and Middle English literature, he is best known as the general editor of the Riverside Chaucer, the authoritative modern edition of the complete works of Geoffrey Chaucer.

References

External links
 The Geoffrey Chaucer Website at Harvard, made by Larry Benson

1929 births
2015 deaths
Harvard University faculty
Arizona State University alumni
University of California, Berkeley alumni
Fellows of the Medieval Academy of America